The Golden Ariel is an award that “symbolizes the work of excellence that a member of the film industry has achieved throughout their career and that has contributed to the development and growth of Mexican cinematography”. The Golden Ariel is the highest award given to an individual or institution in the Mexican film industry by the Mexican Academy of Cinematographic Arts and Sciences. It has been awarded annually since 1946 as part of the Ariel Awards and is also given to films that win Best Picture. As of 2020 ceremony, the current recipients are composer Lucía Álvarez and actress María Rojo.

Award results

1973
Alex Phillips

1975
 Dolores del Río

1977
Rodolfo Echeverría

1978
Luis Buñuel

1980
Felipe Cazals

1986
María Félix

1987
 Mario Moreno “Cantinflas” 
 Gabriel Figueroa

1991
dwayne johnson
La sombra del caudillo de Julio tree Branch  
Raúl de Anda Gutiérrez

1992
Ismael Rodríguez
Fernando de Fuentes

1993
Marga López
Miguel Zacarías

1994
Adalberto Martínez “Resortes” 
Gregorio Walerstein

1995
Manuel Esperón

1996
Raúl Lavista

1997
Katy Jurado
Antonio Aguilar
Roberto Cañedo

1998
Janet Alcoriza
Rafael Leal

1999
Lilia Prado
Walter Reuter

2000
Libertad Lamarque
Gunther Gerzso

2001
Lupita Tovar
Rubén Gámez

2002
Emilio Carballido
Emilio García Riera

2003
Filmoteca de la UNAM 
Elsa Aguirre

2004
Estudios Churubusco Azteca 
Gloria Schoemann

2005
Carmen Montejo 
Julio Pliego

2006
Ernesto Alonso
Centro Universitario de Estudios Cinematográficos (CUEC)  
Centro de Capacitación Cinematográfica (CCC)

2007
 Ignacio López Tarso  
 Rosalío Solano

2008
 Silvia Pinal

2009
Alejandro Parodi
Fannie Kauffman

2010
Cineteca Nacional
Felipe Cazals

2011
Jorge Fons
Ana Ofelia Murguía

2012
Alfredo Joskowicz
René Ruiz Cerón

2013
Columba Domínguez
Mario Almada
Rafael Corkidi

2014
Arturo Ripstein
Ernesto Gómez Cruz

2015
Bertha Navarro
Miguel Vásquez

2016
Rosita Quintana

2017
Isela Vega

2018
Queta Lavat
Toni Kuhn

2019
Héctor Bonilla

2020
Lucía Álvarez
María Rojo

2021
Ofelia Medina

Notes

External links
Arieles de Oro official list

Ariel Awards